Ceratocaryum is a group of plants in the Restionaceae described as a genus in 1836. The entire genus is endemic to Cape Province in South Africa.

Two species in this genus, Ceratocaryum argenteum and Ceratocaryum pulchrum, have an unusual seed dispersal method. Its berries mimic the appearance and smell of antelope droppings. This tricks dung beetles into gathering and burying them.

 Species

References

Restionaceae
Poales genera
Endemic flora of South Africa
Flora of the Cape Provinces
Fynbos
Taxa named by Christian Gottfried Daniel Nees von Esenbeck